The following is the list of infant mortality by states of Mexico, it included all infants under the age of four.

References

Mexico
Infant mortality
 
Infant mortality